Sutherlandia frutescens (cancer bush, balloon pea, sutherlandia, phetola ("it changes") in seTswana, and insiswa ("the one that drives away the darkness") in isiZulu; syn. Colutea frutescens L., Lessertia frutescens (L.) Goldblatt & J.C.Manning) is a southern African legume. It is a shrub with bitter, aromatic leaves.  Red-orange flowers appear in spring to mid-summer.

Cultivation
It is native to dry parts of southern Africa, preferring full sun but tolerant of a wide variety of soil types. It is a tough plant, hardy, fast growing and drought tolerant but short lived. Seeds germinate readily in around two to three weeks and established plants self-seed readily. Seedlings may be vulnerable to damping off, but provided it is in well-drained soil, it grows readily and is not very vulnerable to pests.

References

Galegeae
Flora of Africa
Medicinal plants
Plants described in 1753
Taxa named by Carl Linnaeus